Jeff Loots (born May 19, 1970) is a former American football quarterback who played eight seasons in the Arena Football League (AFL) with the Milwaukee Mustangs, Minnesota Fighting Pike, Albany Firebirds, Oklahoma Wranglers, Chicago Rush, Buffalo Destroyers and Grand Rapids Rampage. He played college football at Southwest Minnesota State.

Early years and college career
Loots attended Central High School in Saint Paul, Minnesota.

He first played college football at Inver Hills Community College in 1989. He then played for the Western Illinois Leathernecks of Western Illinois University in 1990.

He transferred to play college football for the Southwest Minnesota State Mustangs of Southwest Minnesota State University. Loots finished his career with 703 pass competitions on 1,224 attempts for 10,116 and 102 touchdowns, all of which were school records. He was  named first team NAIA All-America in 1992, second team NAIA All-America 1991, honorable mention NAIA All-America in 1990 and second team AP Little All-America in 1992. He recorded 22 wins and five losses as a starter for the Mustangs before he suffered a season ending shoulder injury in week eight of his senior year in 1992. Loots was ranked as the seventh best quarterback in the 1993 NFL Draft by Mel Kiper, Jr. He was inducted into the Northern Sun Intercollegiate Conference Hall of Fame in 2009. He was also inducted into the Southwest Minnesota State Mustangs Hall of Honor in 2007. Loots number 11 is retired by the Mustangs.

Professional career
Loots signed with the Toronto Argonauts of the Canadian Football League in 1993 after going undrafted in the 1993 NFL Draft. He injured his shoulder and sat out the season. He was traded to the expansion Las Vegas Posse and was the first player to sign with the team. Loots later requested his release. He signed with the expansion Milwaukee Mustangs of the AFL in 1994. The Mustangs finished the season with no wins and twelve losses, with Loots recording eleven touchdown passes. 

He was drafted by the expansion Iowa Barnstormers of the AFL in 1995. He competed for the starting quarterback job with Kurt Warner before breaking his foot in the Barnstormers' second preseason game. Loots was then traded to the Florida Bobcats. He was traded to the expansion Minnesota Fighting Pike in February 1996. The Fighting Pike finished their only season with four wins and ten losses, with Loots recording seven touchdown passes. 

He then signed with the AFL's Arizona Rattlers. He was a backup quarterback on the Rattlers from 1997 to 1998. The Rattlers won ArenaBowl XI against the Iowa Barnstormers on August 25, 1997. Loots spent the 2000 season with the Albany Firebirds of the AFL, recording seven touchdown passes. The Firebirds won ArenaBowl XIII against the Orlando Predators on August 21, 1999. He was traded to the Carolina Cobras in April 2000 but refused to report. He was traded to the Oklahoma Wranglers in May 2000. Loots recorded 14 passing touchdowns as the Wranglers finished the regular season with seven wins and seven losses, losing in the second round of the playoffs to the San Jose Sabercats. 

He was signed by the expansion Chicago Rush of the AFL to be their starting quarterback in 2001. He recorded 13 passing touchdowns with the Rush. Loots was traded to the Oklahoma Wranglers during the 2001 season. He recorded 18 passing touchdowns with the Wranglers in 2001. He played from 2002 to 2003 with the AFL's Buffalo Destroyers. Loots recorded 29 passing touchdown during his tenure with the Destroyers. Loots played his final season in 2004 for the Grand Rapids Rampage of the AFL, recording one touchdown pass.

Statistics

Stats from ArenaFan:

References

External links
Just Sports Stats
Jeff Lotts' fan page

Living people
1970 births
American football quarterbacks
Canadian football quarterbacks
American players of Canadian football
Western Illinois Leathernecks football players
Southwest Minnesota State Mustangs football players
Toronto Argonauts players
Las Vegas Posse players
Milwaukee Mustangs (1994–2001) players
Iowa Barnstormers players
Florida Bobcats players
Minnesota Fighting Pike players
Arizona Rattlers players
Albany Firebirds players
Carolina Cobras players
Oklahoma Wranglers players
Chicago Rush players
Buffalo Destroyers players
Grand Rapids Rampage players
Players of American football from Saint Paul, Minnesota
Sportspeople from Saint Paul, Minnesota
Inver Hills Blue Knights football players